This is a timeline of the presence of Eastern Orthodoxy in Greece from 717 to 1204. The history of Greece traditionally encompasses the study of the Greek people, the areas they ruled historically, as well as the territory now composing the modern state of Greece.

Era of Byzantine Iconoclasm (717-842)

717-18 Accession of Leo III the Isaurian to the Byzantine throne; Second Arab siege of Constantinople.
720 Martyrdom of Nicholas the New of Vounina, of Larissa.
721 Caliph Yazid II banned Christian icons in his kingdom.
c. 725 John of Damascus resigns his position as chief councilor (protosymboulos) at the court of Damascus, and becomes a monk and priest at the Great Lavra of St. Sabbas the Sanctified; foundation of the Monastery of the Dormition of the Theotokos on Mount Ithome in Messenia, by iconophile monks (Greek: Ιερά Μονή Κοιμήσεως Θεοτόκου Βουλκάνου).
726 Iconoclast Emperor Leo the Isaurian starts campaign against icons, the Iconoclastic controversy; Emperor Leo III (717–41) publishes his  Ecloga , designed to introduce Christian principle into law.
726-730 John of Damascus wrote three works defending icons, the most important of which was Fountain of Knowledge in three parts, the most important of which was On The Orthodox Faith (De Fide Orthodoxa), a collected summary of the Greek Fathers on major Christian doctrines.
727 The Byzantine themes of Greece rebelled against the iconoclast emperor Leo III and attempted to set up their own emperor, although Leo defeated them.
730 Leo III deposed Patriarch Germanos I who refused to sanction the emperor's iconoclastic policy.
731 Pope Gregory III of Rome called an Italian synod that condemned Iconoclasm as heretical.
732-1850 Era of the Patriarchate of Constantinople.
732-33 Byzantine Emperor Leo III the Isaurian transfers Southern Italy (Sicily and Calabria), Greece, and the Aegean from the jurisdiction of the Pope to that of the Ecumenical Patriarch in response to Pope Gregory III of Rome's support of a revolt in Italy against iconoclasm, adding to the Patriarchate about 100 bishoprics; the Iconoclast emperors took away from the Patriarch of Antioch 24 episcopal sees of Byzantine Isauria, on the plea that he was a subject of the Arab caliphs; the jurisdiction of the Patriarch of Constantinople became co-extensive with the limits of the Byzantine Empire.;
734 Death of Peter the Athonite, commonly regarded as one of the first hermits of Mount Athos.
739 Byzantine forces defeat a great Umayyad invasion of Asia Minor at Battle of Akroinon, renaming the city Nicopolis (Greek for "city of victory").
746 Byzantine forces destroy the Muslim fleet and regain Cyprus from the Arabs.
c. 750-950 Syrian Christians (both Monophysites and the Church of the East) transmitted to Muslims what was known of Greek pagan thought and whatever other knowledge was available in the Syrian language, also influencing the development of Sufism through their mysticism.
751 Cosmas the Melodist, Bishop of Maiuma and foster brother of John of Damascus composed solemn canons in honour of the Nativity, Epiphany and Exaltation of the Holy Cross, fourteen of which are included in the liturgical books of the Eastern Orthodox Church.
754 Iconoclastic Council (Council of Hieria) held in Constantinople under the authority of Emperor Constantine V Copronymus, condemning icons and declaring itself to be the Seventh Ecumenical Council; Constantine begins dissolution of the monasteries.

766 Byzantine Emperor Constantine V also condemned relics and prayers to the Theotokos and to the Saints, extreme measures that even the Iconoclastic Council (Council of Hieria) had not adopted.
767 Martyrdom of Stephen the Younger, Byzantine monk from Constantinople who became one of the leading opponents of the iconoclastic policies of Emperor Constantine V.
769 A Roman synod approved the veneration of icons.
c. 770-772 Byzantine general Michael Lachanodrakon, the strategos (military governor) of the Thracesian Theme and a fanatical supporter of Iconoclasm, dissolved the monasteries and eradicated monasticism within his theme.
 778-779 Byzantines defeat the Muslim Arabs at Germanikeia and expel them from Anatolia.
c. 787 Greek Orthodox bishops were resident in Atil, the capital of Khazaria, and in Samkarsh, subject to the authority of the Metropolitan of Doros in Crimea.

787 Seventh Ecumenical Council held in Nicaea, condemning iconoclasm and affirming veneration of icons.
792 Death of Philaret the Merciful, of Amnia in Asia Minor.
 799 Theodore the Studite and many followers moved from the Sakkudion Monastery in Bithynia to the old Monastery of Stoudios in Constantinople, reorganizing life there in line with the Rules of St. Basil, with the Studion becoming the model for monastic life in the Orthodox Church and influencing the development of monastic life on Mount Athos.
803 Death of Irene of Athens, wife of Byzantine Emperor Leo IV; St. Luke's icon brought to Agiassos on Mytilene.
 810-814 Theophanes the Confessor compiled the Chronicle, continuing the historical work of George Syncellus, covering the years 284-814.
814 Bulgarians lay siege to Constantinople; conflict erupts between Emperor Leo V and Patr. Nicephorus on the subject of iconoclasm; Leo deposes Nicephorus, Nicephorus excommunicates Leo.

815 A synod in the Church of Hagia Sophia affirmed the Iconoclastic Council (Council of Hieria), annulled the Seventh Ecumenical Council (Nicaea II), and recognized the Acta of the iconoclast council of 754.
816 Death of Gregory Decapolites.
818 Vikings known as Rus' plunder the north coast of Anatolia, marking the first known raid of Rus' or Russians, on territory in the Byzantine Empire.
824 Byzantine Crete falls to Arab insurgents fleeing from the Umayyad Emir of Cordoba Al-Hakam I, establishing an emirate on the island until the Byzantine reconquest in 960.
826 Death of Theodore the Studite.
827 Beginning of the Saracen invasion of Byzantine Sicily, which lasted from 827 to 902.
828 Death of Patr. Nicephorus I of Constantinople.
c. 829–842 Icon of Panagia Proussiotissa (Mother of God of Proussa) is re-discovered near Karpenissi in Greece, after it had been lost during its transportation from Asia Minor in 829 AD to save it from iconoclasm; influence of Muslim culture on Byzantines is at a high point during the reign of Emperor Theophilus.
833 Emperor Theophilus began a persecution of iconophiles in the face of several defeats by Muslim Arabs who intended to construct a chain of permanent bases from Tyana to Constantinople, with Theophilus being confirmed in his persecution when the caliph died and the Arabs withdrew.
838 John VII the Grammarian, Patriarch of Constantinople, enacted a harsh persecution of iconophiles, mostly against monks; in August, Caliph al-Mu'tasim captures and destroys Amorium in Anatolia, killing half the inhabitants.
c. 839 First Rus'-Byzantine War, where the Rus' attacked Propontis (probably aiming for Constantinople) before turning east and raiding Paphlagonia.
c. 840 Turks began to move into the Islamic world of the Eastern Mediterranean, as mercenaries and military slaves (Mamluks) of the Muslim Arabs.

Byzantine Imperial era (843–1204)

843 Empress Theodora secures return of icon-veneration with Triumph of Orthodoxy occurring on first Sunday of Great Lent, restoring icons to churches; the monks of Mount Athos send a delegation to Constantinople to celebrate the restoration of the veneration of icons; Theodora, regent of Byzantine emperor, persecutes Paulicians, killing many and confiscating their property, but many escape to Muslim Arab lands; reconquest of Crete from Muslims by Theoctistus, Logothete under Theodora, but island is not held long.
845 Execution of the 42 Martyrs of Amorium, who were taken as hostages from Amorium to Samarra in 838; the work of Dionysius of Tel Mahre provides clear understanding that Islam is a different religion rather than a Christian heresy.
846 Death of Joannicius the Great.
850 Third Finding of the head of John the Forerunner; conversion of Slavs in the Peloponnese.
858 Photius the Great becomes patriarch of Constantinople.
860 Second Rus-Byzantine War, a naval raid and the first siege of Constantinople by the Rus'; Photios, Patriarch of Constantinople dips the Holy Robe of the Theotokos into the sea and a storm drives away the invading Russians.
c. 860 Christianization of the Rus' Khaganate.
861 Cyril and Methodius of Thessaloniki depart from Constantinople to missionize the Slavs; Council of Constantinople, attended by 318 fathers and presided over by papal legates confirms Photius the Great as patriarch and passes 17 canons.
863 Cyril and Methodius arrive in Moravia in the autumn, replacing Frankish missionaries and introducing the Slavonic Liturgy instead of a Latin mass; Cyril and Methodius develop the Glagolitic script for Slavic languages, which is later displaced by Cyrillic script developed in Bulgaria.
864 Christianization of Bulgaria: Baptism of Prince Boris of Bulgaria; Synaxis of the Theotokos of Miasena in memory of the return of her icon.
867 Council of Constantinople held, presided over by Photius, which anathematizes Pope Nicholas I for his attacks on work of Greek missionaries in Bulgaria and use by papal missionaries of Filioque; Pope Nicholas dies before hearing news of excommunication; Basil the Macedonian has Emperor Michael III murdered and usurps Imperial throne, reinstating Ignatius as patriarch of Constantinople; death of Kassia, Greek-Byzantine poet and hymnographer, who composed the  Hymn of Kassiani , chanted during Holy Week on Holy Wednesday.
c. 867 Constantinople sends a bishop to Russia; Byzantine missions sent to Serbia and Croatia.
869–870 Robber Council of 869–870 held, deposing Photius the Great from the Constantinopolitan see and putting the rival claimant Ignatius on the throne, declaring itself to be the "Eighth Ecumenical Council."
870 Conversion of Serbia, when they ask for Byzantine missionaries and come under the jurisdiction of Constantinople; the pilgrim Bernard the Monk, in his Itinerary, gives the first description of the Holy Fire in 870 AD; Malta conquered from the Byzantines by the Arabs.
874 Translation of relics of Nicephorus the Confessor, interred in the Church of the Holy Apostles; Constantinople sends an Archbishop to Russia.
877 Death of Ignatius I of Constantinople, who appoints Photius to succeed him.
878 Arab Muslims conquer the historic city of Syracuse from Byzantium during the Muslim conquest of Sicily (827-902), with the population massacred or enslaved and the city thoroughly looted over two months.
879–880 Eighth Ecumenical Council held in Constantinople attended by 383 fathers passing 3 canons, confirms Photius as Patriarch of Constantinople, anathematizes additions to the Nicene-Constantinopolitan Creed, and declares that the prerogatives and jurisdiction of the Roman pope and the Constantinopolitan patriarch are essentially equal; the council is reluctantly accepted by Pope John VIII.
881 Death of Theoktiste of Lesbos.
883 Mount Athos receives its first imperial privilege and gains autonomy, as Emperor Basil I lays down the boundaries of the monastic republic.
c. 884 Saint Elias the Younger founds a monastery on Mount Aulinas at Palmi, in the province of Reggio Calabria in Calabria, later named after him, likely being the first of the Greek monasteries in South Italy that are mentioned in the Lives of the Saints.
885 Death of Methodius.
886 Death of Joseph the Hymnographer.
888 Byzantine Emperor Leo VI the Wise promulgates the  Basilika, or Imperial Code,  in sixty books, preserving Justinian's Code, and also including works of law initiated by Basil I, including the Prochiron, and the Epanagoge.
892 Death of Theodora the Myrrh-gusher of Thessaloniki.

902 Taormina, the last Byzantine stronghold in Sicily, is captured by the Aghlabids, after a siege of two years.
904 Thessaloniki sacked and pillaged by Saracen pirates under Leo of Tripoli, a Greek pirate serving Saracen interests.
907 Third Rus'-Byzantine War, a naval raid of Constantinople (Tsargrad in Old Slavonic) led by Varangian Prince Oleg of Novgorod, which was relieved by peace negotiations.
908 Mount Athos becomes independent of the coenobia outside of the Athonite peninsula, and the office of Protos, as leader and representative of all the monks, is attested to for the first time.
911 Holy Protection of the Virgin Mary; Russian envoys visit Constantinople to ratify a treaty, sent by Oleg, Grand Prince of Rus'.
912 Nicholas Mystikos restored as Patriarch of Constantinople (912–925); death of Irene Chrysovalantou, abbess of the monastery of Chrysovalantou.
c. 915 Death of Leo Luke of Corleone, the Abbot and Wonderworker of the Monastery of Mount Mula in Calabria, and a founder of Italo-Greek monasticism in Southern Italy, having died a centenarian, after eighty years of monastic life.
925 Death of Peter the Wonderworker and Bp. of Argos, whose writings appear in Patrologia Graeca.
941 Fourth Rus'-Byzantine War;
941–942 Romanos I Lecapenos makes the first known imperial grant to the monks of Mount Athos, of one gold coin per monk, per annum. 
943 The authorities officially define the boundary between the city of Ierissos and the monastic community of Athos.
944 City of Edessa recovered by Byzantine army, including Icon Not Made By Hands.

953 Monastery of Hosios Loukas founded by St. Luke the Younger near Stiris (Thebes) in Greece.
957 Olga of Kiev baptized in Constantinople, Equal of the Apostles.
960 Nikephoros Phokas recaptures Crete for the Byzantines.
961 Founding of Agia Lavra monastery in Kalavryta, Peloponesse, (the symbolic birthplace of modern Greece in 1821).
963 Athanasius of Athos establishes first major monastery on Mount Athos, the Great Lavra; founding of Philosophou Monastery in Dimitsana, Peloponnese (Metropolis of Gortyna and Megalopolis); death of Michael Maleinos, the spiritual father of Athanasius of Athos and a Byzantine monk who commanded great respect among the Christians of Asia Minor, later adopted as a patron saint of Mikhail Feodorovich, the first Romanov tsar.
c. 963–1018 The Chronicle of Monemvasia is composed, narrating the events that depict the Avaro-Slavic conquest and colonization of mainland Greece, covering a period from 587 to 805 AD.
965 Emperor Nikephoros II Phokas regains Cyprus completely for the Byzantines.
968-71 Fifth Rus'-Byzantine War, resulting in a Byzantine victory over the coalition of Rus', Pechenegs, Magyars, and Bulgarians in the Battle of Arcadiopolis, and the defeat of Sviatoslav of Kiev by John I Tzimiskes.
969 Emperor Nikephoros II Phokas captures Antioch and Aleppo from Arabs.
972 Emperor John I Tzimiskes grants Mount Athos its first charter (Typikon).
975 Emperor John I Tzimiskes in a Syrian campaign takes Emesa, Baalbek, Damascus, Tiberias, Nazareth, Caesarea, Sidon, Beirut, Byblos, and Tripoli, but fails to take Jerusalem.
980 Revelation of the Axion Estin  (the hymn "It Is Truly Meet"), with the appearance of the Archangel Gabriel to a monk on Mount Athos.

c. 980–983 Iviron Monastery is built under the supervision of Ioannes the Iberian and Tornikios.
c. 985-990 – Foundation of the Latin Benedictine Monastery of St. Mary on Mount Athos (St. Mary of the Amalfitans, or Amalfion), founded by Leo the Roman, brother of the Duke of Benevento, along with six disciples and the assistance of the Georgians of the Great Lavra, lasting until 1287.
987 Sixth Rus'-Byzantine War, where Vladimir of Kiev dispatches troops to the Byzantine Empire to assist Emperor Basil II with an internal revolt, agreeing to accept Orthodox Christianity as his religion and bring his people to the new faith.
988 Baptism of Rus' begins with the conversion of Vladimir of Kiev who is baptized at Chersonesos, the birthplace of the Russian and Ukrainian Orthodox churches; Vladimir marries Anna Porphyrogenita, sister of Byzantine emperor Basil II.
c. 990 Bp. Œcumenius of Trikka (now Trikkala) in Thessaly writes several commentaries on books of the New Testament.
998 Death of Nikon the Metanoeite ("preacher of repentance").
c. 999–1004 Icon of the Panagia Portaitissa appears on Mount Athos near Iviron monastery.<ref name=OCA-PORTAITISSA>Icon of the Mother of God "Iveron". 12 February. OCA – Feasts and Saints.</ref>
10th-century Paris Psalter produced, a Byzantine illuminated manuscript containing 449 folios and 14 full-page miniatures "in a grand, almost classical style", considered a key monument of the so-called Macedonian Renaissance in Byzantine art; Wonderworking icon of the Archangel Michael of Mantamados is created as a relief icon, moulded from clay and the blood of the martyred monks of the Monastery of the Taxiarhes (Archanagels) of Mantamado; Ο Ταξιάρχης του Μανταμάδου. Ιερά Μητρόπολη Μυτιλήνης. Retrieved: 30 January 2013.
 Citing: ΕΥΣΤΡΑΤΙΟΥ ΔΗΣΣΟΥ (Ιερατικού προϊσταμένου, Ι. Ν. Παμμεγίστων Ταξιαρχών Μανταμάδου). Ποιητικό ιστορικό και θαύματα των Αρχαγγέλων Μανταμάδου. Τόμος Δ'.
(Fr. Efstratios Dissou (Abbot of the Monastery of the Archangels of Mantamado). Poetic History and Miracles of St. Michael, the Archangel of Mantamado. 4th ed.) death Theodora of Vastas (Arcadia).

1004 Nilus the Younger, born to a Greek family in the Byzantine Theme of Calabria, founds the famous Greek Basilian monastery of Grottaferrata, becoming the first abbott. ΟΣΙΟΣ ΝΕΙΛΟΣ, Ο ΕΚ ΚΑΛΑΒΡΙΑΣ. Αποστολική Διακονία της Εκκλησίας της Ελλάδος.
1009 Patr. Sergius II of Constantinople removes name of Pope Sergius IV from the diptychs of Constantinople because the pope had written a letter to the patriarch including the Filioque.
1018 Emperor Basil II went on a pilgrimage to Athens directly after his final victory over the Bulgarians for the sole purpose of worshipping at the Parthenon.
1022 Death of Symeon the New Theologian.

1027 Byzantine-Fatimid treaty is concluded in 1027 between Constantine VIII and Ali az-Zahir allowing for the rebuilding of the Church of the Resurrection, permitting the emperor to select the Patriarch of Jerusalem, and to ensure that those who had unwillingly converted to Islam under al-Hakim could return to Christianity,Guenter B. Risse. Mending Bodies, Saving Souls: A History of Hospitals. Oxford University Press, USA, 1999. p. 139. thus the Byzantine emperors became protectors of the Christians.
1034 Patriarch Alexius I Studites writes the first complete  Studite Typikon , for a monastery he established near Constantinople; this was the Typikon introduced into the Rus' lands by Theodosius of the Kiev Caves.
1036 The treaty of 1027 between Byzantium and the caliphs was renewed in 1036, restoring to the Christians all their property and privileges, and permitting work on the restoration of the Church of the Resurrection by Byzantine masons; the Varangian Guard of the Byzantine Emperor is sent to the Holy Land to protect pilgrims.
1038 Byzantine general George Maniakes partially reconquered the city of Syracuse in Sicily, sending the relics of St. Lucy of Syracuse to Constantinople.

1042 Founding of Nea Moni Monastery on Chios.
1043 University of Constantinople is re-organized under Michael Psellos.
1045 Emperor Constantine IX Monomachos signs the second Typikon of Mount Athos, in which Athos is officially termed The Holy Mountain; there are three large coenobia: the Great Lavra, Iviron and Vatopedion.
1048 The Church of the Resurrection was rebuilt and re-consecrated in 1048, when Constantine IX Monomachos was Emperor and Nicephorus I the Patriarch of Jerusalem; a confraternity was established in Thebes which was devoted to an icon of the Holy Virgin kept in a convent in Naupaktos (Virgin of Nafpaktos / Panagia Nafpaktiotissa).
1053 Death of Lazarus the Wonder-worker of Mt. Galesius near Ephesus.Great Synaxaristes : Ὁ Ὅσιος Λάζαρος ὁ Θαυματουργός ὁ Γαλλησιώτης. 7 Νοεμβρίου. ΜΕΓΑΣ ΣΥΝΑΞΑΡΙΣΤΗΣ.
1054 The Great Schism between Orthodox East and Latin West: excommunication of Ecumenical Patriarch Michael I Cerularius by Cardinal Humbertus, papal legate, while Michael returns the favor by excommunicating the Pope (who had died, rendering his legate's authority null).
1059 The Treaty of Melfi marked the recognition of the Norman power in South Italy, as Pope Nicholas II, a Cluniac monk, invested Robert Guiscard as duke of Apulia, Calabria, and Sicily, regions that were traditionally provinces of the Byzantine Empire and of the Byzantine Rite.
1060-1091 Norman Conquest of Sicily, instrumental in bringing Latin Christianity to an area which historically followed the Greek Byzantine rite.
1068 Arrival of the first Seljuk Turks to Anatolia, by which time the religious war between Byzantium and Islam had already run a course of four centuries.
1071 Seljuk Turks defeat Byzantines at the Battle of Manzikert, beginning Islamization of Asia Minor; Norman princes led by Robert Guiscard capture Bari, the last Byzantine stronghold in Italy, bringing to an end over five centuries of Byzantine rule in the south.
c. 1071–1176 Byzantine epic poem Digenes Akritas is written, set in the 9th and 10th centuries, inspired by the almost continuous state of warfare with the Arabs in eastern Asia Minor, presenting a comprehensive picture of the intense frontier life of the Akrites, the border guards of the Byzantine Empire.
1073 Seljuk Turks conquer Ankara.
1077 Seljuks capture Nicaea.
1087 Translation of the relics of Nicholas of Myra from Myra to Bari.
1082 Council of Blachernae condemned Neoplatonic philosopher John Italus. 
1083 Metropolis of Paronaxia separates from the Metropolis of Rhodes.
1088 Emperor Alexios I Komnenos gave the island of Patmos to Blessed Christodoulos of Patmos to develop as an independent monastic state, with Blessed Christodoulos founding the Monastery of Saint John the Theologian on Patmos (1088-1093).
1093 Death of Christodoulos the Wonderworker of Patmos.Christodulus the Wonderworker of Patmos. Greek Orthodox Archdiocese of America. Retrieved 20 November 2012.
1098 Martyrdom of great-martyr Theodore Gabras, virtual Byzantine governor of Trebizond, in Theodosiopolis by the Danishmend Turks under Amir Ali (Amiralis);Great Synaxaristes : Ὁ Ἅγιος Θεόδωρος ὁ Μεγαλομάρτυρας ὁ Γαβρᾶς. 2 Οκτωβρίου. ΜΕΓΑΣ ΣΥΝΑΞΑΡΙΣΤΗΣ. Pope Urban II called the Council of Bari, attended by more than 180 Roman Catholic bishops, including noted theologian Anselm of Canterbury (the founder of scholasticism) who defended the filioque clause, with the result that the Roman Catholic-dominated council affirmed the filoque and anathematized those who were opposed to it.Claude Fleury. "Histoire Ecclesiastique". t. XIII, p. 625.
11th century Kaisariani Monastery is founded on the slopes of Mount Hymettos, one of the oldest and most important monasteries in Attica; foundation of Kykkos Monastery in Cyprus under the patronage of Byzantine Emperor Alexios I Komnenos, one of the three largest and most historic sacred monasteries of Cyprus, and one of the five stavropegial monasteries of the Church of Cyprus.
1101 The miracle Holy Fire in Jerusalem failed in the year 1101, when the rite was conducted by Latin clergy, so that Baldwin I restored the Greek clergy and the Holy Fire appeared on the Sunday of Pascha only after the Greeks prayed in the absence of the Latins.Christopher Tyerman.  God's War: A New History of the Crusades. Harvard University Press, 2006. p. 231. 
1108 Death of Theophylact of Ohrid, among the most prominent of Orthodox theologians of his time, a true son of Byzantium by upbringing and outlook, who became the Archbishop of Achrida (Ohrid) from c. 1090 to 1108, and a true father and archpastor of the Bulgarian Church, leaving comprehensive commentaries on the Gospels and other New Testament texts based on patristic authority.
1118–1137 Imperial monastery of Christ Pantocrator founded.
1127–1145 Constantinople largest city in the world by population.

1147 Roger II of Sicily takes Corfu from the Byzantine Empire, and pillages Corinth, Athens and Thebes.
1149 Abbot Suger of St. Denis together with Bernard of Clairvaux laid plans for a series of councils which would summon all of France to a new crusade to the Holy Land, including voices such as Peter, Abbot of Cluny who demanded vengeance on the Byzantine Empire over the failure of the Second Crusade, and had correspondence with Roger of Sicily, calling for an expedition against Constantinople.
1170 Council of Constantinople, attended by many Eastern and Western Bishops, on the reunion of the Eastern and Latin Churches, without effect.Rev. John McClintock (D.D.), and James Strong (S.T.D.). Cyclopaedia of Biblical, Theological and Ecclesiastical Literature. Vol. II - C, D. New York: Harper & Brothers Publishers, 1868. p. 491.
1176 Sultanate of Rum defeats Byzantine Empire in the Battle of Myriokephalon, marking end of Byzantine attempts to recover Anatolian plateau.

1179 Pope Alexander III convened the Third Lateran Council, which was attended by a certain Nectarios of the important Basilian Monastery of St. Nicholas of Kasoulon near Otranto, under Norman patronage, who made himself the champion of the Greek Church, and vigorously supported their customs and doctrines.
1182 Large-scale massacre of Latin inhabitants of Constantinople, who at that time dominated the city's maritime trade and financial sector, further worsening relations and increasing enmity between the Western and Eastern churches, and resulting in a sequence of hostilities between the two that followed; Michael II Choniates is the last Metropolitan of Athens before the Latin conquest (1182-1205, in exile 1205-1222).
1183 Dedication of Monreale Cathedral in Sicily (1174-1189, Benedictine), containing the largest cycle of Byzantine mosaics extant in Italy.Colin Morris. The Papal Monarchy: The Western Church from 1050 to 1250. Oxford history of the Christian Church. Oxford University Press, 1989. p. 545.
1185 Norman conquest of Thessaloniki, resulting in a full-scale massacre of the city's inhabitants including some 7,000 victims.
1188 Emperor Isaac II Angelos agreed to Sultan Saladin's request to build a new mosque (and not just use an existing one) in Constantinople.
1189 The contingent of the Third Crusade led by German King Frederick Barbarossa occupied Philippopolis in Thrace; Frederick Barbarossa wrote to his son Henry VI to send a fleet and attack the capital, also writing to the pope for his blessing, stating that it was necessary to eliminate the Empire if they were going to have any success in their enterprise against the Moslems.

1192–1489 Church of Cyprus is subordinated to the French Lusignans with a Latin Hierarchy established by the Crusaders.
1193 The renowned canonist Theodore Balsamon argued on the basis of Canon 7 of the Second Ecumenical Council that Latin baptisms, based on one immersion, ought to be considered as invalid, because their case was similar with that of the Eunomians.
12th century Skete life begins in Meteora; on the eve of the Frankish conquest, the Church of Greece, ecclesiastically under the jurisdiction of the Ecumenical  Patriarch, contained twelve (12) metropolitan sees, of which Corinth and Athens were the two most important, while Patras, Larissa, Naupaktos, Neopatras, Thebes, Corfu, Naxos, Lacedaemonia, Argos, and the Cretan see of Gortyna completed the dozen.

See also

Eastern Orthodoxy in Greece
List of archbishops of Athens
Greek Orthodox Church
Eastern Orthodox Church organization
History
History of the Eastern Orthodox Church
History of Eastern Christianity
History of the Eastern Orthodox Church under the Ottoman Empire
History of Eastern Orthodox Churches in the 20th century
Timeline of Eastern Orthodoxy in America
Church Fathers
Apostolic Fathers
Church FathersAnte-Nicene Fathers (book)Desert FathersNicene and Post-Nicene FathersList of Church Fathers

Notes

References

Bibliography
 Rev. Dr. Andrew Louth. Greek East and Latin West : The Church, AD 681–1071. The Church in History Vol. III. Crestwood, N.Y. : St. Vladimirs Seminary Press, 2007.
 Rev. Dr. Andrew Louth and Dr. Augustine Casiday (Eds.). Byzantine Orthodoxies: Papers from the Thirty-Sixth Spring Symposium of Byzantine Studies, University of Durham, 23–25 March 2002. Society for the Promotion of Byzantine Studies, Volume 12. Ashgate Publishing, Ltd., 2006.
 Anthony Kaldellis. The Byzantine Republic: People and Power in New Rome. Harvard University Press, 2015. 312 pages. 
 Donald Nicol. Church and Society in Byzantium. Cambridge University Press, 2008.
 Dimitri Obolensky. The Byzantine Commonwealth: Eastern Europe, 500–1453. New York, NY: Praeger Publishers Inc., 1971.
  Ferdinand Gregorovius. Geschichte der Stadt Athen im Mittelalter. Von der Zeit Justinians bis zur türkischen Eroberung. Stuttgart, 1889.
 ("History of Athens in the Middle Ages. From Justinian to the Turkish Conquest." 1889.)
 Florin Curta. Southeastern Europe in the Middle Ages, 500-1250. Cambridge University Press, 2006.
 John Meyendorff. The Byzantine Legacy in the Orthodox Church. Crestwood, N.Y. : St. Vladimirs Seminary Press, 1982.
 John Meyendorff. Byzantine Theology: Historical Trends and Doctrinal Themes. 2nd ed. Fordham Univ Press, 1979.
 J. M. Hussey. Church & Learning in the Byzantine Empire, 867–1185. Oxford University Press, 1937.
 Milton V. Anastos. Aspects of the Mind of Byzantium: Political Theory, Theology, and Ecclesiastical Relations with the See of Rome. Ashgate Publications, Variorum Collected Studies Series, 2001.
 Milton V. Anastos. "The transfer of Illyricum, Calabria, and Sicily to the jurisdiction of the Patriarchate of Constantinople in 732-33." In: Anastos, Studies in Byzantine Intellectual History. Variorum Collected Studies Series, London, 1979.
 Prof. Anthony Kaldellis. A Heretical (Orthodox) History of the Parthenon. Department of Greek and Latin, The Ohio State University. 01/02/2007. (.pdf)
 Fr. Robert F. Taft (S.J.), Patriarch Athenagoras Orthodox Institute. Through Their Own Eyes: Liturgy as the Byzantines Saw It. InterOrthodox Press, 2006. 172pp.
 Speros Vryonis, (Jr). "Byzantine Attitudes towards Islam during the Late Middle Ages." Greek Roman and Byzantine Studies 12 (1971).
 Steven Runciman. The Byzantine Theocracy. Cambridge University Press, 2004.
 Stephanos Efthymiadis, (Open University of Cyprus, Ed.). The Ashgate Research Companion to Byzantine Hagiography: Volume I: Periods and Places. Ashgate Publishing, Ltd., December 2011. 464 pp.  
 Stephanos Efthymiadis, (Open University of Cyprus, Ed.). The Ashgate Research Companion to Byzantine Hagiography: Volume II: Genres and Contexts. Ashgate Publishing, Ltd., March 2014. 536 pp.  
 Timothy S. Miller. Medieval Byzantine Christianity''. Ed. by Derek Krueger. A People's History of Christianity, Vol. 3. Minneapolis, Fortress Press. 2006. pp. 252.

Byzantine Greece
Byzantine Iconoclasm
Cultural history of Greece
Greek Orthodoxy
Orthodoxy in Greece
 
Christianity in the Byzantine Empire
Orthodox Church